The city of St. Paul, Minnesota held an election on November 7, 2017, to elect its next mayor, which was won by city councilman Melvin Carter III. Chris Coleman, who served as mayor from 2006, did not run for a fourth term and instead planning to run for Governor of Minnesota in 2018. This was the second mayoral election in St. Paul to use ranked-choice voting. Municipal elections in Minnesota are non-partisan, although candidates can identify with a political party.

Candidates 
 Melvin Carter III, DFL, former city council member, director of the Office of Early Learning, Minnesota Department of Education
 Elizabeth Dickinson, Green, environmental advocate, 2005 Mayoral candidate
 Tom Goldstein, DFL, former St. Paul School Board member, 2015 City Council candidate, small business owner 
 Pat Harris, DFL, former city council member and government banking specialist at BMO Harris Bank.
 Tim Holden, Nonpartisan, 2013 mayoral candidate, small business owner
 Dai Thao, DFL, city council member

Declined to Run 

 Kristin Beckmann, deputy mayor
 Amy Brendmoen, city council member
 Chris Coleman, mayor
 Erin Dady, former mayoral chief of staff
 Tim Mahoney, state representative
 Erin Murphy, state representative

References

External links 
Melvin Carter for Saint Paul
Elizabeth Dickinson for Saint Paul
Tom Goldstein for Saint Paul
Pat Harris for Saint Paul
Tim Holden for Saint Paul
Dai Thao for Saint Paul

Mayoral elections in Saint Paul, Minnesota
2017 Minnesota elections
2017 in Minnesota
Saint Paul